The 1949-50 Oberliga season was the second season of the Oberliga, the top level of ice hockey in Germany. Eight teams participated in the league, and SC Riessersee won the championship.

Regular season

References

Oberliga (ice hockey) seasons
West
Ger